The Romaniacs was a Canadian rock band based in Vancouver, British Columbia. Their music combined Eastern European, Gypsy jazz, and pop. They made extensive use of costumes and props, including a large map, during their live shows.

History

The Romaniacs formed in 1984. They performed at first in clubs and small venues, telling an invented story of their ethnic history of the band members.

The band toured extensively in Canada and the United States.They had a long stint at the Saskatchewan Pavilion at Expo 86 in Vancouver, and that year released their first recording on cassette, entitled Ethno-Fusion. The group also toured Australia in 1988, including a week-long appearance at the Canada Pavilion during the World's Fair in Brisbane. That year they released their first album, World on Fire.

In 1990 the band contributed the song "Ecstasy of the Martyr" to the compilation album Polka Comes to Your Haus.
The Romaniacs disbanded in 1995.

Personnel 

 Calvin Cairns (aka Myron Joseph, king romaniac) – violin
 Steve Bengtson (aka Steffy Levine) – mandolin and vocals
 Scott White – upright bass
 William (Billy) Butler – guitar
 Danny Greenspoon (aka Zoltan Flamingo Romaniac) – guitar
 Jim Vivian – upright bass
 Victor Bateman – upright bass
 Ron Thompson – guitar
 Richard Baker – guitar

Discography 
 Ethno-Fusion
 World on Fire
 The Ecstasy of the Martyr (a compilation released only in Japan)

References

Bibliography
 The Canadian Society for Traditional Music. Retrieved 10 May 2007.
 Scott White's past details from scottwhite.net. Retrieved 10 May 2007.

Canadian world music groups
Musical groups established in 1984
Musical groups disestablished in 1995